Juárez is a town and one of the 119 municipalities of Chiapas, in southern Mexico.

As of 2010, the municipality had a total population of 21,084, up from 19,956 as of 2005. It covers an area of 161.5 km².

As of 2010, the town of Juárez had a population of 7,286. Other than the town of Juárez, the municipality had 49 localities, the largest of which (with 2010 populations in parentheses) were: Nuevo Volcán Chichonal (1,162) and El Triunfo 1ra. Sección (Cardona) (1,141), classified as rural.

References

Municipalities of Chiapas